This is All: The Pillow Book of Cordelia Kenn is a young adult novel by Aidan Chambers, published in 2005.

It is the last work in the "Dance sequence" of six novels, preceded by Breaktime, Dance on My Grave, Now I Know, The Toll Bridge, and Postcards from No Man's Land.

Synopsis
Teenager Cordelia Kenn writes a pillow book for her unborn daughter, speaking of her friendships, romantic experiences, poetry, her special relationship with her teacher Julie, a boy named Will, trees and how her daughter came to be. The pillow book was inspired from Sei Shonagon's pillow book during the Heian Culture in Japan, from which she also gets her inspiration for poetry from Poetry Immortal Izumi Shikibu. Throughout the book's 800 pages Cordelia's teenage years and her character are written and made important to readers.

Bibliography
This Is All: The Pillow Book of Cordelia Kenn, Bodley Head, 2005, ; reprint Amulet Books, 2008,

References

External links 
 

2005 British novels
Epistolary novels
British young adult novels
Novels about teenage pregnancy
The Bodley Head books